Clearbrook or Clear Brook may refer to:

Places 
 Canada
 Clearbrook, Alberta
 Clearbrook, Abbotsford, British Columbia

 United States
 Clear Brook (Nanticoke River tributary), a stream in Delaware
 Clearbrook, Minnesota
 Clearbrook, New Jersey
 Clear Brook, Virginia

Other uses 
 Clear Brook High School, in Harris County, Texas
 Clearbrook Human Service Agency in Illinois
 Clearbrook, a fictional female wolfrider elf from the comic book series Elfquest